The South Staffordshire coalfield is one of several coalfields in the English Midlands. It stretches for 25 miles / 40 km from the Lickey Hills in the south to Rugeley in the north.

Coal measures
Numerous coal seams are recognised within the coalfield - the following coal seams are recognised within the Cannock section of the coalfield - an area sometimes separately referred to as the Cannock coalfield or Cannock Chase coalfield:
Middle Coal Measures
 Top Robins
 Bottom Robins
 Charles
 Brooch
 Benches
 Eight Feet
 Park
 Upper/Top Heathen
 Lower/Bottom Heathen
Lower Coal Measures
 Yard
 Bass
 Cinder
 Shallow
 Deep
 Mealy Greys

Within the southern part of the coalfield, fewer seams are recognised due to the 'Benches', 'Eight Feet' and 'Park' seams combining as the 'Thick' whilst the two 'Heathen' seams combine, the 'Yard' and 'Bass' seams combine as the 'New Mine' and the 'Cinder', 'Shallow' and 'Deep' combine as the 'Bottom';

Middle Coal Measures
 Brooch
 Thick
 Heathen
Lower Coal Measures
 New Mine
 Bottom
 ?Mealy Greys

Iron ore
In addition to coal the South Staffordshire coalfield has been mined for its iron ore. In 1855, William Truran in The Iron Manufacture of Great Britain reported South Staffordshire to have sixty-five sites, a total of 169 furnaces and an annual production of around 950,000 tons of crude iron; the third largest producing area in Great Britain after South Wales and Scotland.

See also

 Cannock Chase Coalfield
 Black Country Geopark
 Coal mining in the Black Country

References 

Coal mining regions in England
Geography of Staffordshire
Geology of Staffordshire